Cherish is a 2002 American comedy-drama film written and directed by Finn Taylor.  It premiered at the Sundance Film Festival on January 14, 2002 and had a limited theatrical release June 7 of that same year.  The Region 1 DVD was originally released June 1, 2004 and then re-released on October 25, 2005 with new cover art.

Synopsis
Zoe Adler (Robin Tunney), is a shy, eccentric and misunderstood computer animator who has a love for 1970s and 80s pop music.  While heading home after a few drinks one night, she is forced into her car by a stalker who steers her into a police officer, knocking him off his bicycle and killing him.

When Zoe is put under house arrest with a story no one believes and an electronic bracelet that keeps her homebound with an ever-increasing list of mandatory and repetitive tasks she must complete or risk going to jail, she must find a way to clear her name.  With the help of Daly (Tim Blake Nelson), an officer responsible for checking her bracelet every week who falls for her, a downstairs neighbor, and neighborhood kids, Zoe finds her stalker and tries to clear her name.

Cast

External links

Official site

2002 films
2002 comedy-drama films
American comedy-drama films
American independent films
Films about stalking
Films set in San Francisco
Films set in the San Francisco Bay Area
2002 independent films
2000s English-language films
2000s American films